Nadthawan Panthong (born November 16, 1997), known professionally as Stamp Fairtex, is a Thai Muay Thai kickboxer and mixed martial artist. She is currently signed to ONE Championship, where she is ranked #1 in the ONE Championship Women's Atomweight rankings. She is the organization's first two-sport world champion, having held the ONE Atomweight Muay Thai World Championship and ONE Atomweight Kickboxing World Championship.

Initially competing in the all-striking ONE Super Series, Stamp made her mixed martial arts debut on October 11, 2018. She won the 2021 ONE Women's Atomweight World Grand Prix.

Her stage name is inspired by the Fairtex Gym in Pattaya where she trained from age 18.

Background
Stamp's father is a former Muay Thai fighter who competed under the name Wisanlek Lukbangplasoy. Stamp started practicing Muay Thai at the age of 5 in order to avoid bullying in school, with her father training her. A year later, she would win her first fight by KO via knees. She became a Muay Thai champion of a local stadium and a two-division Eastern Thailand champion. Going into her teenage years, Stamp took eight years off of Muay Thai due to being unable to find suitable opponents in her hometown region, in addition to there being a lack of women's Muay Thai fights being held at the time. 

At 18, she moved to the Fairtex Gym in Pattaya, where she would also begin training in Brazilian jiu-jitsu. Stamp has won a gold medal at the 2019 Siam Cup BJJ tournament in the women's gi 58.5kg class.

Muay Thai & Kickboxing career
In her ONE Championship debut at ONE Championship: Kingdom of Heroes on October 6, 2018, she challenged Kai Ting Chuang for the ONE Atomweight Kickboxing World Championship. Stamp would win by unanimous decision, claiming her first ONE world title.

She was next scheduled to face Janet Todd for the inaugural ONE Atomweight Muay Thai World Championship at ONE Championship: Call to Greatness on February 22, 2019. Stamp won the fight by unanimous decision to claim the ONE Atomweight Muay Thai World Championship and become ONE Championship's first two-sport world champion.

Stamp Fairtex would defend her ONE Atomweight Muay Thai World Championship against Alma Juniku at ONE Championship: Legendary Quest on June 15, 2019. She retained her title by a unanimous decision victory.

After three straight mixed martial arts matches, Stamp will face Janet Todd for the second time to defend the ONE Atomweight Kickboxing World Championship at ONE Championship: King of the Jungle on February 28, 2020. Stamp lost the title to Todd via a closely contested split decision, marking her first-ever loss in ONE Championship.

Stamp Fairtex is scheduled to defend her Atomweight Muay Thai belt for the second time during ONE Championship: A New Breed on August 28, 2020, with her opponent being the Queens of the Ring Flyweight Tournament winner Allycia Rodrigues. After five rounds, Stamp lost the title to Rodrigues by majority decision.

On January 11, 2023, it was announced that Stamp would face Anissa Meksen for the interim ONE Women's Atomweight Kickboxing World Championship.

Mixed martial arts career

ONE Warrior Series
After being scouted by Rich Franklin, Stamp made her mixed martial arts debut on ONE Warrior Series 2 on July 19, 2018. She knocked out Rashi Shinde with a head kick in just 19 seconds of the first round. The victory earned her a contract with ONE Championship.

ONE Championship
Stamp announced her intentions to compete in mixed martial arts in ONE Championship, with the goal of becoming a ONE World Champion in MMA as well. She made her ONE Championship promotional MMA debut against Asha Roka at ONE Championship: Dreams of Gold on August 16, 2019. Stamp won by submission at 1:29 of the third round via rear naked choke. Following the submission victory, she was given her blue belt in Brazilian jiu-jitsu by De'Alonzio Jackson.

Stamp was next expected to face Bi Nguyen at ONE Championship: Masters of Fate on November 8, 2019. After dominating all three rounds with her Muay Thai-based striking, she would go on to win by unanimous decision.

Stamp next faced Puja Tomar at ONE Championship: A New Tomorrow on January 10, 2020. Stamp went on to defeat Tomar by TKO at 4:27 of the first round via ground and pound.

Leading up to her fight with Tomar, Stamp had voiced her interest in facing Mei Yamaguchi, who she said possesses high-class wrestling skills, in order to test her own skill level. She hopes a fight with Yamaguchi will help solidify her all-round MMA skills before she potentially challenges for a ONE World Title. "My stand-up game is really good. It is strong, but my ground game still needs a lot of work," Stamp said, "I need to improve my ground game and get stronger because (reigning ONE Women’s Atomweight World Champion) Angela Lee is good all-around."

Stamp next faced Sunisa Srisen at ONE Championship: No Surrender on July 31, 2020. She extended her winning streak to five with a first round TKO of Srisen.

She then faced Alyona Rassohyna at ONE Championship: Unbreakable 3 on January 22, 2021. Despite dominating the majority of the fight, Stamp lost by submission via a last-effort guillotine choke in the closing seconds, earning her first loss in MMA competition. While there was initially some controversy surrounding the fight, with Stamp arguing she did not tap, media outlets generally agreed that she did tap out.

2021 ONE Women's Atomweight Grand Prix 
Stamp faced Alyona Rassohyna in a rematch as the quarterfinal bout of ONE Women's Atomweight Grand Prix at ONE Championship: Empower on May 28, 2021. However, the event was postponed due to COVID-19. The event was rescheduled for September 3, 2021. She avenged her loss, winning the bout via split decision.

Stamp was scheduled to face Seo Hee Ham in the semi-final bout of ONE Women's Atomweight Grand Prix at ONE Championship: NextGen on October 29, 2021. Ham later withdrew from the bout after suffering an injury in training, and was replaced by Julie Mezabarba. She won the fight by unanimous decision.

Stamp faced Ritu Phogat in the ONE Women's Atomweight Grand Prix Final at ONE: Winter Warriors on December 3, 2021. She defeated Phogat by submission via armbar in the second round to win the 2021 ONE Women's Atomweight World Grand Prix Championship.

Later atomweight career
Stamp faced Angela Lee for the ONE Women's Atomweight Championship at ONE: X on March 6, 2022. Even though she hurt Lee with a liver punch in the first round, she lost the bout by submission via rear-naked choke in the second round.

Stamp faced Jihin Radzuan at ONE on Prime Video 2 on October 1, 2022. At the weigh-ins, Radzuan weighed in at 120.25 pounds, 5.25 lbs over the atomweight non-title fight limit. Radzuan was fined 30% of their purse, which went to their opponent Stamp. Stamp won the fight by unanimous decision.

Before Stamp faced Radzuan, it was announced that Anissa Meksen will fight Stamp in a Mixed Rules-bout at ONE on Prime Video 6 on January 14, 2023 at the Impact, Muang Thong Thani in Bangkok. After she won, Fairtex responded to being called a 'dancer' by Meksen, stating that Meksen has never won a ONE Championship-belt, as Fairtex actually held both the ONE Atomweight Muay Thai and Kickboxing title simultaneously. The fight was cancelled on the day of weigh-ins, as Meksen failed to appear. Stamp was re-scheduled to face Anna Jaroonsak in a strawweight kickboxing bout at the same event. Stamp won the fight by split decision and was awarded a $50,000 bonus afterwards.

Stamp is scheduled to face Alyse Anderson on May 5, 2023, at ONE Fight Night 10.

Titles and accomplishments

Mixed martial arts
ONE Championship
2021 ONE Women's Atomweight World Grand Prix Champion
MMA Female Fighter of the Year 2021
2022 MMA Fight of the Year

Muay Thai
ONE Championship
ONE Women's Atomweight Muay Thai World Champion (one time; former)
One successful title defense

Thepprasit Stadium 
Thepprasit Stadium Light Flyweight/108 lbs Champion (one time)

Kickboxing
ONE Championship
ONE Women's Atomweight Kickboxing World Champion (one time; former)
Performance of the Night (One time)

Brazilian jiu-jitsu
Siam Cup BJJ 
 2019 Siam Cup BJJ Women's Gi 58.5kg - 1st place

Muay Thai record

|-  style="background:#cfc;"
| 2023-01-14 || Win ||align=left| Supergirl Jaroonsak || ONE on Prime Video 6 || Bangkok, Thailand || Decision (Split) || 3 || 3:00 
|-
|-  style="background:#FFBBBB;"
| 2020-08-28 || Loss ||align=left| Allycia Rodrigues || ONE Championship: A New Breed || Bangkok, Thailand || Decision (Majority) || 5 || 3:00 
|-
! style=background:white colspan=9 |
|-  style="background:#FFBBBB;"
| 2020-02-28 || Loss ||align=left| Janet Todd || ONE Championship: King of the Jungle || Kallang, Singapore || Decision (Split) || 5 || 3:00 
|-
! style=background:white colspan=9 |
|-  style="background:#cfc;"
| 2019-06-15|| Win ||align=left| Alma Juniku || ONE Championship: Legendary Quest || Shanghai, China || Decision (Unanimous) || 5 ||3:00 
|-
! style=background:white colspan=9 |
|-  style="background:#CCFFCC;"
| 2019-02-22|| Win ||align=left| Janet Todd || ONE Championship: Call to Greatness || Kallang, Singapore || Decision (Unanimous)|| 5 || 3:00
|-
! style=background:white colspan=9 |
|-  style="background:#CCFFCC;"
| 2018-10-06|| Win ||align=left| Kai Ting Chuang || ONE Championship: Kingdom of Heroes || Bangkok, Thailand || Decision (Unanimous)|| 5 || 3:00
|-
! style=background:white colspan=9 |
|-  style="text-align:center; background:#cfc;"
| 2017-03-28 || Win||align=left| Sylvie Petchrungruang || Thepprasit Stadium || Pattaya, Thailand || Decision || 5 || 3:00
|-
! style=background:white colspan=9 |
|-  style="background:#CCFFCC;"
| 2016-08-13|| Win ||align=left| Saokhonkaen Sor Sompol || PPTV Muay Thai Fight Night || Bangkok, Thailand || Decision || 3 || 3:00
|-
|-
| colspan=9 | Legend:

Mixed martial arts record

|-
|Win
|align=center|9–2
|Jihin Radzuan
|Decision (unanimous)
|ONE on Prime Video 2
|
|align=center|3
|align=center|5:00 
|Kallang, Singapore
|
|-
| Loss
| align=center|8–2
| Angela Lee
| Submission (rear-naked choke)
|ONE: X
|
|align=center| 2
|align=center| 4:50
|Kallang, Singapore
|
|-
| Win
| align=center|8–1
| Ritu Phogat
| Submission (armbar) 
|ONE: Winter Warriors
|
|align=center| 2
|align=center| 2:14
|Kallang, Singapore
|
|-
| Win
| align=center|7–1
| Julie Mezabarba
| Decision (unanimous)
| ONE Championship: NextGen
| 
| align=center| 3
| align=center| 5:00 
| Kallang, Singapore
| 
|-
| Win
| align=center|6–1 
| Alyona Rassohyna
| Decision (split) 
| ONE Championship: Empower
| 
| align=center| 3
| align=center| 5:00
| Kallang, Singapore
| 
|-
| Loss
| align=center|5–1
| Alyona Rassohyna
| Submission (guillotine choke)
| ONE Championship: Unbreakable 3
| 
| align=center| 3
| align=center| 4:53
| Kallang, Singapore 
|
|-
| Win
| align=center| 5–0
| Sunisa Srisen 
| TKO (punches) 
| ONE Championship: No Surrender
| 
| align=center| 1 
| align=center| 3:57  
| Bangkok, Thailand 
|
|-
| Win
| align=center| 4–0
| Puja Tomar
| TKO (punches and elbows) 
| ONE Championship: A New Tomorrow
| 
| align=center| 1 
| align=center| 4:27  
| Bangkok, Thailand 
|
|-
| Win
| align=center| 3–0
| Bi Nguyen 
| Decision (unanimous)
| ONE Championship: Masters of Fate
| 
| align=center| 3 
| align=center| 5:00 
| Manila, Philippines 
| 
|-
| Win
| align=center| 2–0
| Asha Roka
| Submission (rear-naked choke)
| ONE Championship: Dreams of Gold
| 
| align=center| 3
| align=center| 1:29
| Bangkok, Thailand 
| 
|-
| Win
| align=center| 1–0
| Rashi Shinde 
| KO (head kick) 
| ONE Warrior Series 2
| 
| align=center| 1
| align=center| 0:19 
| Kallang, Singapore
| 
|-

See also
List of female kickboxers 
List of female mixed martial artists 
List of current ONE fighters

References

Notes

External links
 Stamp Fairtex at ONE Championship

1997 births
Living people
Stamp Fairtex
Stamp Fairtex
Stamp Fairtex
Atomweight mixed martial artists
Mixed martial artists utilizing Muay Thai
Mixed martial artists utilizing Brazilian jiu-jitsu
Stamp Fairtex
Female Brazilian jiu-jitsu practitioners
Stamp Fairtex
ONE Championship kickboxers
Kickboxing champions
Muay Thai champions
ONE Championship champions